The 2013 British & Irish Lions tour to Australia was a rugby union tour during June and July 2013. The British & Irish Lions played ten matches - a three-test series against Australia, and matches against the five Australian Super Rugby sides, a Combined New South Wales–Queensland Country team, and a match en route to Australia against the Barbarians.

The Lions won the test series 2–1. The first test was won by the Lions 23–21, the second by Australia 16–15, and the final test by the Lions 41–16. The victory was the Lions' first test series win since defeating South Africa in 1997. Aside from the second test, the Lions' only loss was 14–12 to the Brumbies in Canberra.

Wales head coach Warren Gatland was the Lions' head coach, and their tour captain was Sam Warburton.

Schedule
Ahead of the tour of Australia, the Lions played the Barbarians in Hong Kong on 1 June to mark the 125th anniversary of the first Lions tour. They then played the five Australian Super Rugby teams, a Combined Country team and three tests in Brisbane, Melbourne and Sydney.

Notes: Bold denotes the winner of each match.

Test series
The Lions won the best-of-three test series 2–1, after a convincing victory in the deciding third test followed narrow victories for both teams in the preceding two matches. The teams competed for the Tom Richards Cup, which was first presented in 2001, the last time the Lions toured the country. Australia won the 2001 test series 2–1. Before the start of the 2013 series, the Lions had won 15 of their 20 tests against Australia dating back to 1899.

First test
The Lions won the first test 23–21. Australia's Christian Lealiifano, making his debut, had to be replaced after just 52 seconds when he was knocked out attempting to tackle Jonathan Davies. Australia recovered from that setback to score the opening try, Israel Folau scoring on his debut with a sprint to the line after a chip through by scrum-half Will Genia. George North then added to a Leigh Halfpenny penalty with a try of his own, evading Pat McCabe and James O'Connor on his way to the line. He might have had a second a few minutes later, but the television match official deemed him to have been in touch before grounding the ball, meaning that the Lions had to settle for another penalty. Instead it was Folau who picked up a second try, beating Johnny Sexton and Halfpenny to cut the Lions' lead to a single point at half-time.

After two more Australian backs – Berrick Barnes and McCabe – suffered injuries, Michael Hooper had to move into the centres, and Liam Gill took his place in the back row. The Lions took advantage of Hooper's unfamiliar position and Alex Cuthbert scored under the posts. An exchange of penalties left Australia within two points of the Lions going into the last five minutes. Kurtley Beale had two late penalty opportunities for Australia, but missed twice, slipping as he made his second attempt with the last kick of the game.

Second test
Australia won a close game. Leigh Halfpenny's penalty kicking gave the Lions the lead, but the Wallabies scored the only try of the game through Adam Ashley-Cooper in the 74th minute, eventually winning 16–15. In the last minute of the game, a Leigh Halfpenny penalty kick that would have won the game for the Lions dropped short of the posts, meaning that the series would be decided by the final test.

Third test
The Lions made six changes to their starting team. Tour captain Sam Warburton and 2009 captain Paul O'Connell were both injured. Pre-game controversy focused on the decision of the Lions coaches to drop experienced centre Brian O'Driscoll, who had been widely expected to take over the captaincy, in favour of the Welsh combination of Jamie Roberts and Jonathan Davies. The Lions' starting team included 10 Welshmen in all. Australia were unchanged except for the selection of George Smith, returning from international retirement, at openside flanker.

Australia gave away possession at the kick-off, and Alex Corbisiero scored an early try for the Lions. The Lions extended this lead through four penalties from Leigh Halfpenny. The Wallabies conceded several penalties, as well as a sin-binning, at the scrum, although in the period either side of half-time, they recovered to trail only 19–16. The Lions, however, scored three further tries to win 41–16, thus recording the most points by a Lions side in a test match.

Squads

Lions
Tour manager Andy Irvine announced an initial squad of 37 on 30 April 2013, made up of 15 players from Wales, 10 from England, nine from Ireland and three from Scotland.

Wales' Sam Warburton was named captain; at the age of 24, he was the youngest man to lead the Lions. Warburton was captain of Wales during their Six Nations Grand Slam in 2012, and during the 2011 World Cup, where they finished fourth. Previous Lions captains Paul O'Connell (from 2009) and Brian O'Driscoll (2005) were also chosen.

Dylan Hartley was initially selected but was removed from the squad before the squad departed, after being suspended for 11 weeks for abusing a referee. Rory Best replaced Hartley later that day, meaning that the squad that set off to Hong Kong on 27 May consisted of 15 Welsh, 10 Irish, nine English and three Scottish players.

Alex Corbisiero was called up to the squad to replace Cian Healy, who suffered ankle ligament damage in the match against the Western Force, while Ryan Grant was called up to replace the injured Gethin Jenkins. Tommy Bowe broke his hand against the Queensland Reds, and Simon Zebo was brought into the squad. England's Brad Barritt, Christian Wade and Billy Twelvetrees were called in to provide further cover for the backs.

Gatland made a surprise selection on 16 June, calling up former Wales wing Shane Williams for the game against the Brumbies. Williams, playing club rugby in Japan, was already due to travel to Australia as a radio commentator, and was brought into the squad for only three days.

Ireland prop Tom Court was called up on 23 June before the final mid-week fixture against Melbourne Rebels, allowing Mako Vunipola to miss that match. Alex Corbisiero had injured his calf in the first test, so the Lions faced a shortage of props. Court was already in Australia visiting his home town of Brisbane.

O'Connell and Warburton were injured in the first and second tests respectively, ruling them out of playing in any more games in the tour.

Notes: Ages listed are as of the first tour match on 1 June. Bold denotes that the player was selected for a previous Lions squad.

Management and staff
Andy Irvine was the Lions' tour manager, having succeeded Gerald Davies, who became Lions chairman.

Although Irvine originally stated that it was unlikely that a current coach of one of the Home unions would be appointed to coach the Lions, New Zealander Warren Gatland was offered the role in March 2012 with the Welsh Rugby Union's support, before being confirmed in September 2012. Gatland promised impartial selection and said he believed that Graham Henry in 2001 picked too many Welsh players who were not good enough to go on the tour. Gatland signed a 10-month contract with the Lions, taking a sabbatical from coaching Wales, although he would coach his Welsh team against Australia and New Zealand in autumn 2012.

Australia
Australia head coach Robbie Deans selected a 31-man squad for the test series against the Lions, to be captained by James Horwill.

Luke Morahan was added to the squad following an injury Joe Tomane sustained in training.

Following the first test, George Smith, Jesse Mogg and Ben Tapuai were called up to the squad.

Match details

 

First test

Second test

Third test

Attendances

The tour drew record attendances to several of the 10 matches. The Lions opened the tour in front of 28,643 for a game against the Barbarians at the Hong Kong Stadium. Their first game in Australia attracted 35,103 to Patersons Stadium for their opening match in Australia against the Western Force, while their next game against the Queensland Reds at Suncorp Stadium attracted a record Reds home attendance of 50,136. The game against the ACT Brumbies attracted 21,655 to Canberra Stadium for the Lions first loss of the tour. Three days before the game against the Brumbies, 40,805 saw the Lions thrash the New South Wales Waratahs 47–17 at the Sydney Football Stadium. In the only tour game played after the test series had started, the Lions attracted a rugby union record crowd of 28,648 to AAMI Park where they defeated the Melbourne Rebels 35–0.

The test series against Australia was even more successful and drew the record sporting attendance to each stadium used. The first test saw 52,499 at Suncorp Stadium, the second test drew 56,771 to Melbourne's Etihad Stadium, while 83,704 attended the third and deciding test at the ANZ Stadium in Sydney.

Broadcasting
Fox Sports and Network Ten televised the tour in Australia, and in the UK and Ireland the games were shown by Sky Sports. Talksport provided live UK radio commentary of all matches.

Sky Sports NZL covered the tour in New Zealand and SuperSport in South Africa. In Europe, Sky Italia showed the tour in Italy, Vatican City and San Marino while Canal+ covered it in France, Andorra and Luxembourg. The tour was covered by Setanta Sports Asia across most of Asia and the Pacific Islands and J Sports showed fixtures in Japan. Gulf DTH covered the Arabic countries in Asia. ESPN Latin America showed the tour in South America and DirecTV in America (on Channel 490) and Setanta Sports Canada in Canada.

Sponsors
HSBC is the main sponsor of the Lions, having also sponsored their 2009 tour to South Africa. Adidas are the playing and training supplier and have been since the 1997 tour, while Rhino supply training aids. Microsoft are the Lions' technology partners and Thomas Pink supply the official formal and evening wear for the team. Qantas are the official airline of the tour, as well as the main sponsors of the Wallabies. DHL are the sponsors of the tour itself and Gilbert provide all match balls. Specsavers are the sponsors of all match officials.

References

External links
Official Site
2013 British & Irish Lions tour to Australia at ESPN

2013
2012–13 in British rugby union
2012–13 in Irish rugby union
2013 in Australian rugby union
2013 rugby union tours